Asociación Social y Deportiva Justo José de Urquiza, known simply as Justo José de Urquiza, is an Argentine football club from the Caseros district of Tres de Febrero Partido in Greater Buenos Aires. The team currently play in Primera B, the regionalised third division of the Argentine football league system.

The club is named in honour of Justo José de Urquiza, Argentine general and president of the Argentine Confederation between 1854 and 1860.

Titles
Primera D: 1
 1994–95

External links
Official website 

Justo José de Urquiza
Justo José de Urquiza
Justo José de Urquiza
Justo José de Urquiza